Kaşık Havası (spoon tune) or Kaşık Oyunları (spoon dances) are folk dances mostly spread over the Mediterranean region and have a varying structure of their arrangement, performance, rhythmic, and melodic characteristics. The instruments used are beast bow (later violin), baglama and clarinet, in general, they are accompanied by folk songs.

References

Turkish folk music
Turkish folk dances